Invitation or The Invitation may refer to:

Films
Invitation (1952 film), an MGM film starring Dorothy McGuire and Van Johnson
The Invitation (1973 film), a Swiss film
The Invitation (2003 film), an American film starring Lance Henriksen
Invitation (2008 film), an Iranian film by Ebrahim Hatamikia
The Invitation (2015 film), an American thriller film
The Invitation (2022 film), an American horror film

Television
"The Invitation" (Daria episode), a 1997 episode of Daria
"The Invitation", a 2015 episode of Lego Ninjago: Masters of Spinjitzu

Music

Albums
Invitation (Milt Jackson album), 1962
Invitation (Andrew Hill album), 1974
Invitation (Joanne Brackeen album), 1976
Invitation (Norman Connors album), 1979
Invitation (Kenny Barron album), 1991
Invitation (Jaco Pastorius album), 1983
Invitation (Joe Sample album), 1993
Invitation (Altaria album), by the band Altaria, 2003
Invitation (EP), a 2012 EP by Ailee
The Invitation (Thirteen Senses album), 2008
The Invitation (Meredith Andrews album), 2004
Invitation (Filthy Friends album), 2017
Invitation (UP10TION album), 2018
Invitation (Carrie Akre album)
An Invitation, an Inara George album, 2008

Songs
"Invitation" (song), theme music for the 1952 film by Bronislau Kaper which has become a jazz standard
"Invitation", a song by Status Quo from the 1986 album In the Army Now
"An Invitation", a 2014 song by Lena Katina
"The Invitation", a song by The Black Heart Procession from their 2002 album Amore del Tropico
"Invitation", a song by Dannii Minogue from her 2007 album Unleashed
"Invitation", a 2018 song by Ashnikko featuring Kodie Shane from Unlikeable
"Invitation", a 2019 diss track by Nick Cannon; see Lord Above

Other uses
The Invitation (ballet), a one-act ballet by Kenneth MacMillan

See also
 Invitational (disambiguation)
 Wedding invitation, an invitation to a wedding, often an ornate greeting card